Jake West (born 1972) is a British film director, known mostly for his horror films and for a series of documentaries looking at film censorship and interviewing well-known directors, actors and industry figures.

Biography
West's first feature film was Razor Blade Smile, released in 1998. His second film, released in 2005, was Evil Aliens, described as a 'British slapstick horror-comedy', in the tradition of films such as Braindead, House, and Evil Dead. It was the first full-length British horror film to be filmed using Sony HD cameras and contains over a hundred digital effect shots as well as many conventional gory special effects.

Following the success of Evil Aliens, West directed a made-for-TV sequel to the 1988 film Pumpkinhead. Pumpkinhead: Ashes to Ashes was co-written by West with Barbara Werner. The film was shot in Romania for the American Sci Fi Channel.

His next film Doghouse was a horror-comedy starring Danny Dyer, Noel Clarke and Stephen Graham, whose 'magic ingredient' was a 'sly script' by British comic book creator Dan Schaffer, who is known for Dogwitch and The Scribbler. The movie was released in 2009.

Filmography
Club Death (1994) 
Razor Blade Smile (1998) 
 Whacked (2002)
Evil Aliens (2005)
Pumpkinhead: Ashes to Ashes (2006)
Doghouse (2009)
Video Nasties: Moral Panic, Censorship & Videotape (2010)
The ABCs of Death (2012)
Video Nasties: Draconian Days (2014)

References

External links
 
 Jake West at the BFI

1972 births
Living people
English film directors